= Chawari =

Subcaste (gotra) of the Gurjar community

- Ethnicity: Gurjar
- Location: Rajasthan, Haryana, Punjab, Pakistani Kashmir, Himachal Pradesh, Uttarakhand, Jammu and Kashmir
- Religion: Hinduism, Islam

Chawari or Chhawari is a subcaste (gotra) of the Gujjar community with no particular religious identity; they are found among Hindu and Muslim Gujjars. They mostly inhabit in the land of five rivers Punjab, Pakistani Kashmir, Himachal Pradesh, Uttarakhand and Jammu and Kashmir.
